The sangmin were the common people of Joseon-era Korea.

Etymology
A more polite but less accurate name for the sangmin is "yangmin".

History
The sangmin consisted of peasants, heavy laborers, fishermen, some craftsmen and merchants. The sangmin were considered "clean workers" but had little social status. Generally they were poor. They paid most of Korea's taxes and were subject to the military draft. Their lives were hard, but they were the foundation of the Joseon dynasty, just like the chungin were the backbone of the government. Some of the sangmin owned land which they farmed. Others rented land from the yangban as tenant farmers. Those that did not farm had the lowest status. In everyday life, the sangmin were the working people who struggled to survive. The yangban and chungin controlled and ruled over them. The sangmin did the heavy work. During the late Joseon period, particularly in the 19th century the sangmin rebelled many times because of oppression and corruption by the yangban.

See also 

Yangban
Chungin
Cheonmin
Baekjeong
Nobi
Donghak Peasant Revolution

External links 
info Korea 

Korean caste system
Social classes